Michael McDonald (born 24 June 1999 in Republic of Ireland) is an Irish born Australian rugby union player who plays for Ulster in the United Rugby Championship. His playing position is scrum-half. He signed to the New South Wales Waratahs squad for the 2020 season. Ulster announced in July 2022 that McDonald would be joining them on a one year deal. He was selected for the Emerging Ireland squad for the Toyota Challenge in South Africa in September 2022.

Reference list

External links
Rugby.com.au profile
Ulster Rugby profile
itsrugby.co.uk profile
itsrugby.co.uk profile

1999 births
Australian rugby union players
Living people
Rugby union scrum-halves
New South Wales Waratahs players
Perth Spirit players
Sydney (NRC team) players
Western Force players
Rugby union players from County Louth
Ulster Rugby players